The Tales of Hoffmann is a 1951 British Technicolor comic opera film written, produced and directed by the team of Michael Powell and Emeric Pressburger working under the umbrella of their production company The Archers. It is an adaptation of Jacques Offenbach's 1881 opera The Tales of Hoffmann, itself based on three short stories by E. T. A. Hoffmann.

The film stars Robert Rounseville, Moira Shearer, Robert Helpmann and Léonide Massine and features Pamela Brown, Ludmilla Tchérina and Ann Ayars. Only Rounseville and Ayars sang their own roles.

The film's soundtrack consists of music conducted by Sir Thomas Beecham and played by the Royal Philharmonic Orchestra. In addition to Rounseville and Ayars, singers included Dorothy Bond, Margherita Grandi, Monica Sinclair and Bruce Dargavel. The film's production team included cinematographer Christopher Challis and production and costume designer Hein Heckroth, who was nominated for two 1952 Academy Awards for his work.

Plot

In the prologue, Hoffmann is in the audience at a performance by Stella, a prima ballerina, of "The Ballet of the Enchanted Dragonfly". Stella sends Hoffmann a note asking him to meet her after the performance, but the note is intercepted by his rival, Councillor Lindorf. Not having received her note,  Hoffmann goes to the tavern in the interval, where he tells the story of a clown, Kleinzach, and three stories of his past loves — Olympia, Giulietta and Antonia, and gets drunk.
In the first story, Olympia is an automaton created by scientist Spalanzani  and magic spectacle maker Coppelius. Hoffmann falls for the doll, ignorant of her artifice and is mocked when he finally discovers she is 'automatic'.
In the second story, Hoffmann in Venice falls for Giulietta, a courtesan, but she seduces him to steal his reflection for the magician Dapertutto.
In the third story, Antonia is a soprano suffering from an incurable illness and must not sing, but the evil Dr. Miracle makes her sing and she dies, breaking the hearts of Hoffmann and her father, Crespel.
Finally, in the epilogue, Hoffmann explains that all three women are all aspects of his love, Stella, who then appears in the tavern and, seeing Hoffmann drunk and incapacitated, is led away by Councillor Lindorf.

Adaptation

Though the original French libretto is presented in an English translation, the film is relatively faithful to the traditional adaptations of Offenbach's last opera and incorporates his unfinished score with the thread of the plot. However, certain important changes were made in the process of adapting the story to film: 
In the prologue of the film, all of Lindorf's music is excluded, making him a silent character. 
Stella's profession is changed from an opera singer appearing in Mozart's Don Giovanni to a ballet dancer. 
"The Tale of Antonia" is shortened, ending with the powerful trio for Antonia, the ghost of her mother, and Dr. Miracle rather than Antonia's death scene. This tale was especially moved to the third act, replacing the Giulietta tale and thus causing a switch to each act.
The role of Nicklaus is abridged, though Nicklaus (as played by Pamela Brown) still appears.

Cast

Production

In the later years of his partnership with Pressburger, Powell became interested in what he termed "a composed film", a marriage of image to operatic music. The finale of Black Narcissus and the ballet sequence of The Red Shoes were earlier steps toward his goal.

The Tales of Hoffmann is an achievement of this ideal, as the entire opera was prerecorded to create the soundtrack and the film was edited to the rhythms of the music. The production is completely without dialogue and, with the exception of Robert Rounseville and Ann Ayars, none of the actors did their own singing. Some of the singers had established careers in Britain at the time. Grahame Clifford, for example, had been a leading comedian with the D'Oyly Carte Opera Company for several years, and Monica Sinclair was fast becoming an audience favourite at Covent Garden; she would later become one of the company's most popular artists of the next two decades. The acting (especially by Helpmann) is highly stylised and similar to that of the silent-film era.

Each tale is marked by a primary colour denoting its theme. "The Tale of Olympia", set in Paris, has yellow contours highlighting the farcical nature and tone of the first act. "The Tale of Giulietta" is a hellish depiction of Venice, where dark colours, especially red, are used. The final tale, set in Greece, uses different shades of blue, alluding to its sad nature. The set design is deliberately made to look artificial with the costumes similarly stylised. The opening scene of the "Tale of Giulietta" (in which Giulietta performs the "Barcarolle", the most famous theme of the opera) is staged on a gondola that moves through deliberately artificial Venetian canals, although it does not seem to actually move on the water.

The Tales of Hoffmann was in production from 1 to 16 July 1950 at Shepperton Studios in Shepperton, Surrey, UK.

Critical reception
Following the film's world premiere in New York City, Bosley Crowther of The New York Times wrote:

Reportedly, Cecil B. DeMille sent a letter to Powell and Pressburger saying: "For the first time in my life, I was treated to Grand Opera where the beauty, power and scope of the music was equally matched by the visual presentation."

For the 2002 Sight & Sound poll, George A. Romero called it his "favourite film of all time; the movie that made me want to make movies." Three years earlier, Romero had introduced the film as part of the "Dialogues: Talking with Pictures" programme at the 1999 Toronto International Film Festival. Romero later taped an interview for the Criterion Collection edition, discussing his love of the film and its influence on his career. Martin Scorsese, an ardent fan of Powell and Pressburger, provides an audio commentary track on the Criterion edition.

In a book on the British cinema, André Bazin is quoted as saying:

Accolades
At the 24th Academy Awards, The Tales of Hoffmann received two nominations, both for Hein Heckroth, for Best Art Direction-Set Decoration, Color and Best Costume Design, Color; the awards in both cases went to the crew of An American in Paris.

Powell and Pressburger were nominated for the Grand Prize of the 1951 Cannes Film Festival and won the Exceptional Prize. They also won the Silver Bear award for best musical at the 1st Berlin International Film Festival.

Soundtrack
The soundtrack was recorded at Shepperton Studios between May and September 1950, conducted by Sir Thomas Beecham. Decca obtained permission from London Films to release the soundtrack album. In response, Beecham sued, as he had not approved the release because the soundtrack did not truly represent his interpretation of the opera because of the changes made for the film. On 20 March 1951, he failed to obtain a high court injunction to prevent the release but received assurances that the album would be clearly labelled as having been taken from the soundtrack.

2015 rerelease
In March 2015, the 4K restoration of the film, produced by Martin Scorsese's The Film Foundation, the British Film Institute and Studiocanal, was released in the U.S. by Rialto Pictures. The restored version runs 136 minutes, including a final -credits sequence of all the performers and singers not seen in any previous releases.

References

Bibliography
 Gibbon, Monk. The Tales of Hoffmann: A Study of the Film. London: Saturn Press, 1951. 96pp (illus)
 Christie, Ian. Arrows of Desire: the films of Michael Powell and Emeric Pressburger. London: Faber & Faber, 1985. . 163pp (illus. filmog. bibliog. index.)
 Powell, Michael. A Life in Movies: An Autobiography. London: Heinemann, 1986. .
Germano, William: Tales of Hoffmann: London: BFI/Palgrave Macmillan: 2013.
 Powell, Michael. Million Dollar Movie. London: Heinemann, 1992. .

External links
 
 
 The Tales of Hoffmann at the British Film Institute
 The Tales of Hoffmann. Full synopsis (with film stills and clips viewable only from UK libraries), from the BFI's Screenonline
 The Tales of Hoffmann reviews and articles at the Powell & Pressburger website
The Tales of Hoffmann essay by Bruce Eder at the Criterion Collection
Tales from the Lives of Marionettes an essay by Ian Christie at the Criterion Collection
 Rialto Pictures page on re-release of the film

1951 films
1950s musical fantasy films
Opera films
British musical fantasy films
Films by Powell and Pressburger
Films based on operas
Films set in the 1800s
Films set in the 1810s
Films set in Germany
Films set in Venice
Biographical films about writers
Films based on works by E. T. A. Hoffmann
Jacques Offenbach
Films based on The Sandman (short story)
1950s English-language films
1950s British films